Mark Preston (born July 21, 1971) is Vice President of Political & Special Events Programming at CNN, and a CNN Senior Political Analyst. His role is to oversee CNN’s election night coverage across its broadcasting and online platforms, organize CNN’s presidential debates and forums, and serve as CNN's main contact with political campaigns at both the state and national level, and to lead the conception and execution of CNN's political events.

Preston also provides political analysis for CNN, CNN International and CNN.com, regularly appearing on CNN's major news analysis shows such as New Day, Erin Burnett OutFront, Anderson Cooper 360°, Cuomo Prime Time and CNN Tonight with Don Lemon, and was promoted to Senior Political Analyst in January 2017. He was formerly CNN's Political Director, a post subsequently taken by David Chalian in 2014.

Early life
Preston was born in July 1971 and is the son of Eugene Preston and Mary Preston.

Education
Preston was educated at Arlington High School, a public secondary school in the town of Arlington, Massachusetts, from which he graduated in 1990, followed by the University of Massachusetts Amherst, known as UMass Amherst, where he studied Journalism and History. While there, he worked on the Massachusetts Daily Collegian, and freelanced for the Associated Press. After a month, he was hired to work for the office of Senator Edward Kennedy. Preston graduated from UMass Amherst in 1994, with two B. A. degrees, in Journalism and History.

Life and career
Preston started his career as a print journalist. He was a correspondent at States News Services, a wire service in Washington D.C. and at the Marietta Daily Journal in Marietta, Georgia, during which he won several Georgia Press Association and Georgia Associated Press reporting awards.

Preston was a senior staff writer for the Capitol Hill newspaper Roll Call, during which he was a congressional correspondent revealing important policy and political decisions made behind closed doors. He appeared on many media outlets as a guest analyst, including CNN, C-SPAN, Fox News, ABC Radio, National Public Radio and Radio America, as well as local media outlets.

Early in his career, Preston saw the collapse of the newspaper industry and the rise of 24-hour news. He decided to leave print journalism to join CNN.

Career at CNN
Preston joined CNN in 2005 as political editor. He played a key role in the network’s election night coverage in 2006, which won an Emmy Award, and of CNN’s 2008 campaign coverage, which won a Peabody Award. In 2011, he became CNN’s Political Director. The network received another Emmy Award for its coverage in 2012. Preston's work contributed to CNN receiving Syracuse University’s i-3 Mirror Award for the YouTube presidential debates and an EPpy Award for Best News/Politics Blog. In 2014, he became Executive Editor of CNN Politics while retaining his work as an on-screen political analyst, appearing on a wide variety of CNN programs. In January 2017, he was promoted to CNN Senior Political Analyst.

SiriusXM Satellite Radio
Preston co-hosted with Chris Frates the weekly satellite radio program Politics Inside Out, on Sirius XM Satellite Radio's Channel 124, known as P.O.T.U.S. In July 2017, he left the program, which was retitled Politics Inside Out with Chris Frates, while Preston began single-hosting a new political program, Full Stop with Mark Preston.

Personal life
Preston married Meredith Ray Bonner on July 8, 2000, while a reporter at the Capitol Hill newspaper Roll Call, at the Holy Spirit Catholic Church in Atlanta, Georgia, the U.S. state in which they first met as reporters at the Marietta Daily Journal, in the city of Marietta. The couple spent their honeymoon in North Carolina.

See also
 List of CNN personnel

References

External links
 Mark Preston — CNN profile
 Mark Preston on Facebook 
 Mark Preston on Twitter
 

Living people
20th-century American journalists
21st-century American journalists
American broadcast news analysts
American male journalists
American political journalists
American television reporters and correspondents
CNN people
Journalists from Massachusetts
People from Arlington, Massachusetts
University of Massachusetts Amherst College of Social and Behavioral Sciences alumni
1971 births
Arlington High School (Massachusetts) alumni